Pinky Dinky Doo is an animated children's television series created by Jim Jinkins. It was produced and co-owned by Jinkins' Cartoon Pizza and Sesame Workshop. The series was made in association with Discovery Kids Latin America, and the Canadian Broadcasting Corporation (season 1). For the second season, Abrams Gentile Entertainment, and the Canadian studio Keyframe Digital Productions joined as production companies. Each episode follows an imaginative pink-haired girl named Pinky Dinky Doo, her brother Tyler and pet Mr. Guinea Pig as she makes up her own stories.

The character of Pinky Dinky Doo was created by Jim Jinkins as a bedtime story for his daughter. In 2002, he developed the idea into a two-part web series, produced by his company Cartoon Pizza alongside Sesame Workshop. In 2003, Random House released a series of six children's books featuring the character, and on April 5, 2005, the show's first season made its worldwide premiere on Discovery Kids in Latin America. The show was first broadcast in English on CBC Television in December 2005.

From January 17, 2016 to January 2, 2021, the series aired in reruns on HBO Kids as part of HBO's deal with Sesame Workshop. It was also added to the HBO Max streaming service upon its launch on May 27, 2020, before being taken off on January 2, 2021. The series is now available to stream on Sensical, a free streaming service by Common Sense Media.

Plot
Pinky Dinky Doo is a girl who lives in Great Big City with her parents, her little brother Tyler, and their house pet Mr. Guinea Pig. She loves to write stories, especially for Tyler. Each episode begins with Tyler having a problem, such as not being able to find his shoes or not wanting to take a bath. At that point, Pinky says, "That gives me an idea." Tyler asks, "Pinky, are you going to make up a story?" and Pinky responds, "Yes-a-rooney, positooney!" (which means "Yes, positively!"), dancing to a cardboard box called the Story Box. Using chalk and her imagination, she tells a story. In the second season, whenever the Story Box is unavailable, Pinky uses the Story Pad, a notebook in which she draws pictures using a pencil for her newer stories.

Each story features Pinky herself as the main character, and the story plots are centered around Tyler's main issue. Because they are made up stories, there tends to be unusual or silly things that occur, something that Tyler typically points out although Pinky reminds him that anything can happen in a made up story. At the climax of each story a problem starts to arise, so Pinky must "Think Big," at which point her head swells (like a balloon filling with air) and she comes up with an often wacky solution to the problem while singing "If I have a problem, don't know which way to go, I think and think and think and think, and suddenly I know." Some episodes feature different variations of the "Think Big" sequence:
 In Big Blob of Talk, Pinky had to "Listen Big" instead, leading to her ears swelling up in addition to her head.
 In Back to School Is Cool, Pinky's hair swells instead of her entire head due to her having a bad hair day.
 In Tyler to the Rescue, Two Wheel Dreams, Go to Bed Tyler!, and Tyler's Big Idea, Tyler thinks big instead of Pinky.
 In Shrinky Pinky, Mr. Guinea Pig thinks big instead of Pinky.

After each story, Tyler solves his own problem and knows what to do.

Characters

Dinky Doo family
 Pinky Dinky Doo (voiced by India Ennenga)
 Tyler Dinky Doo (voiced by Felix Chrome in season 1; Allison Wachtfogel in season 2)
 Mr. Guinea Pig (voiced by Juan Van Michaelangelo in season 1; John Rogers in season 2)
 Mommy Dinky Doo (voiced by Heather Dilly in season 1; Lindsie Van Winkle in season 2)
 Daddy Dinky Doo (voiced by Jim Jinkins)

Friendly characters
 Nicholas Biscuit (voiced by Justin Riordan (Thomas Sharkey) in season 1; Katherine Rose Riley in season 2)
 Bobby Boom (voiced by Kalif Jenkins in season 1 and Ralph Peavy in season 2)
 Daffinee Toilette (voiced by Carolina Hernandez in season 1 and Anabelle Berrido in season 2)

History

Production
The series was created and produced by Cartoon Pizza and Sesame Workshop, which co-own the copyright to the series. These two companies were the sole producers of the show's pilot episodes. For the first season, Discovery Kids and the Canadian Broadcasting Corporation joined as co-producers. Abrams Gentile Entertainment and Keyframe Digital Productions joined as production companies in the second season. Abrams Gentile financed part of the season in exchange for licensing and merchandising rights, and Keyframe animated the season. The intro for both seasons, as well as episodes from the first season, used flash animation using Macromedia Flash, while episodes from the second season switched over to computer animation using 3DS Max, with the characters being animated via a 3D rig as opposed to being completely 3-Dimensional.

Pinky Dinky Doo was an international co-production. Cartoon Pizza, Sesame Workshop, Noggin, and Abrams Gentile were based in the United States; CBC and Keyframe Digital were based in Canada; Discovery Kids was based in Latin America; and CBeebies was based in the United Kingdom. For season two, the budget was about 200,000 Canadian dollars per episode.

Jim Jinkins originally created Pinky Dinky Doo in 2000 as a bedtime story for his then four-year-old daughter. In an interview with Animation Magazine, he admitted, "It wasn't pre-meditated as a kid's show." In 2002, Jinkins worked with Sesame Workshop to create two web-based pilot episodes starring Pinky, which were released online in 2003. From 2003 to 2004, Random House published a series of six children's books centered around Pinky. Jim Jinkins said of his work with Sesame Workshop: "The Workshop was a beautiful partner ... they didn't overhaul it, but saw it as natural literacy project."

Broadcast
Pinky Dinky Doo made its worldwide premiere on April 5, 2005, on Discovery Kids in Latin America. The show was first broadcast in English on CBC Television, which premiered the show in December 2005. Other Canadian networks that aired Pinky Dinky Doo include TVOntario and Knowledge Network, as well as TFO in French Canada. In most other territories, Sesame Workshop aimed to premiere the show in the first quarter of 2006.

Before the series premiere, Kidscreen announced that broadcast rights for Pinky Dinky Doo had been sold to ABC Television in Australia. It was also announced that Sesame Workshop was "focusing on securing German and French [broadcast] partners," which became Super RTL in Germany and France 5.

Pinky Dinky Doo was sold to over 35 international broadcasters. The American Forces Network, a channel operated by the U.S. Armed Forces, aired Pinky Dinky Doo from 2006 to 2016. In the United States, Noggin had temporary broadcast rights for Pinky Dinky Doo in 2006 and aired it as one of several acquired shows. The show continued to air upon Noggin's rebranding into the Nick Jr. channel on September 28, 2009, where the show aired until April 8, 2011. The Spanish-language U.S. network Univision aired Spanish dubs of the show as part of its Saturday morning programming block for children, Planeta U, from Planeta U’s launch on April 5, 2008, to September 3, 2011. HBO Kids aired the series in reruns as part of HBO's partnership with Sesame Workshop between 2016 and 2021. The show was made available on the HBO Max streaming service upon its launch on May 27, 2020, and it was available until January 2, 2021. The series is now available to stream on Sensical, a free streaming service by Common Sense Media.

In the United Kingdom, the show was broadcast on the BBC's children's network CBeebies. It was redubbed and broadcast with British English voices, although the series was put on hiatus between December 31, 2006, and May 28, 2007. In Brazil, TV Cultura aired a Brazilian Portuguese dub. The series also aired on Rai Yoyo in Italian, Baraem in Arabic, and Hop! Channel in Hebrew (Hop! Channel being available exclusively In Israel).

Episodes

Description
The show was intended to help preschool-aged viewers increase their vocabularies with its Great Big Fancy Word, which is featured several times during the episode. It also addresses problem-solving skills as well as the basics of narrative stories—character, dialogue, plot, details, main idea, and sequence of events. After Pinky tells her story and solves the problem of the day, kids are invited to play an interactive game on the Cheese Sandwich toy, where they review details about the story. At the end of each episode, Pinky says, "I love to make up stories. I'll bet you can make up a story too." In each episode, there is also a "Great Big Fancy Word",  but when somebody is about to say the word, Mr. Guinea Pig will blow a trumpet and then the character says the word.

This series was created by Jim Jinkins, who originally made up Pinky's adventures as bedtime tales for his children. The executive producers are Jinkins and David Campbell. It is a production of Sesame Workshop, Cartoon Pizza, Keyframe Digital, and Abrams Gentile Entertainment. According to the show's website, it is intended to promote reading and imaginative storytelling.

Notes

References

External links
 Official Sesame Workshop site
 Official CBC site
 Official BBC site
 
 Pinky Dinky Doo Review

2000s American animated television series
2010s American animated television series
2006 American television series debuts
2011 American television series endings
2000s Canadian animated television series
2010s Canadian animated television series
2006 Canadian television series debuts
2011 Canadian television series endings
American children's animated fantasy television series
American flash animated television series
American preschool education television series
American television shows based on children's books
American television series with live action and animation
Animated preschool education television series
Animated television series about children
Animated television series about families
Canadian children's animated fantasy television series
Canadian flash animated television series
Canadian preschool education television series
Canadian television shows based on children's books
Canadian television series with live action and animation
2000s preschool education television series
2010s preschool education television series
Television series created by Jim Jinkins
Television series by Sesame Workshop
CBeebies
English-language television shows